Riz Ahmed is a British-Pakistani actor, producer and rapper.

He is known for his appearances in films such as Four Lions (2010), The Reluctant Fundamentalist (2012), Closed Circuit (2013), Nightcrawler (2014), Jason Bourne (2016), Rogue One (2016), The Sisters Brothers (2018), Venom (2018), and Mogul Mowgli (2020). Ahmed gained critical acclaim and awards notoriety for his leading role in Darius Marder's drama film Sound of Metal (2020), a film in which Ahmed also served as an executive producer. Ahmed earned Academy Award, Golden Globe Award, British Academy Film Award, and Screen Actors Guild Award nominations for his performance. He received the Independent Spirit Award for Best Male Lead for his performance.

Ahmed also won acclaim for his leading role in the HBO limited series, The Night Of (2017), starring opposite John Turturro. For his performance he received a Primetime Emmy Award for Outstanding Lead Actor in a Limited Series or Movie. He also received Golden Globe Award, and Screen Actors Guild Award nominations for his performance. Ahmed also received a Primetime Emmy Award for Outstanding Guest Actor in a Comedy Series nomination for his role in the HBO comedy series Girls (2017).

Major associations

Academy Awards

British Academy Film Awards

Golden Globe Awards

Independent Spirit Awards

Primetime Emmy Awards

Screen Actors Guild Awards

Festival awards

Miscellaneous awards

Critics awards

References 

Ahmed, Riz